Xtul, (pronounced ), is a small village in the state of Yucatán, Mexico. The village, like a few others located on the gulf coast, was a location where salt was harvested from the tidal pools in the area; the salt trade in this area dates back to Pre-Columbian times.

Xtul is noted as the location where some 30 members of The Process Church of The Final Judgment went in 1966. They set up camp in an abandoned salt factory.  While there they were hit by Hurricane Inez. The resulting storm lasted for three days. It was during this time that the basic theology of The Process Church was formed, and later written as "The Xtul Dialogues".

References 

Populated places in Yucatán